Phytomyzinae is a subfamily of flies in the family Agromyzidae. There are at least 520 described species in Phytomyzinae.

Genera
 Amauromyza
 Aulagromyza
 Calycomyza
 Cerodontha
 Chromatomyia
 Haplomyza
 Liriomyza
 Metopomyza
 Napomyza
 Nemorimyza
 Paraphytomyza
 Phytobia
 Phytoliriomyza
 Phytomyza
 Pseudonapomyza

References

Further reading

 Diptera.info
 NCBI Taxonomy Browser, Phytomyzinae
 

 Bugguide.net. Subfamily Phytomyzinae

Agromyzidae
Brachycera subfamilies